Meri Mamu (English: My Mother, Nepali: मेरी मामु) is an 2018 Nepalese drama film, directed and written by Yam Thapa. The film is produced by Santosh Sen, under the banner of Aasusen Films. The film stars Ayub Sen, Kusum Gurung, Saruk Tamrakar, and Aaslesha Thakuri in the lead roles.

Plot 
After his mother's death Prem (Ayub Sen) thinks his step mother was responsible for her death, and who makes attempts to kill her.

Cast 

 Ayub Sen as Prem
 Kusum Gurung as Mamata
 Saruk Tamrakar as Aakash
 Aaslesha Thakuri as Manisha

Soundtrack

References

External links 

 

2018 films
2018 drama films
Nepalese drama films